Alberto Guerrero Martínez (28 June 1878 – 21 May 1941) was acting President of Ecuador in 1932 for three months.

He was President of the Senate twice - from 1923 to 1924 and from August 1932 to December 1932.

References

External links
 Encyclopedia of Ecuador 

1878 births
Presidents of Ecuador
Presidents of the Senate of Ecuador
1941 deaths